Jacques Victor Léon Escudier (17 September 1821 – 22 June 1881) was a prominent French journalist, music critic and music publisher.

Career
Escudier was born in Castelnaudary. In 1837, together with Marie Escudier, his brother, and Jules Maurel he founded the weekly La France musicale as well as a music publishing company. In December 1860, he founded the journal L'Art musical. From 1850 to 1858, he worked for Le Pays and Journal de l'Empire. Escudier was the French publisher of Giuseppe Verdi's works. All Verdi's works were apparently included in the Escudier catalogue. The Escudier brothers helped to establish Verdi's reputation across Europe as the leading composer of Italian opera. From 1876 to 1878, Léon Escudier directed the Ventadour Room at the Théâtre italien de Paris where he staged Verdi's operas.

He wrote, in collaboration with his brother, Études biographiques sur les chanteurs contemporains (1840), Dictionnaire de musique (1844), Vie et aventures des cantatrices célèbres (1856), and his autobiography, Mes souvenirs (1870).

After he died in Paris, his catalogue came up for auction and was bought by a range of French music publishers including E. & A. Girod, Louis Gregh, Léon Grus, Georges Hartmann, Henri Heugel, Auguste Le Bailly, Alphonse Leduc, Henry Lemoine, and Auguste O'Kelly.

References

External links
 Works published by Escudier on IMSLP
 

1821 births
1881 deaths
19th-century French businesspeople
19th-century French journalists
19th-century French male writers
French male journalists
French male writers
French music critics
French music publishers (people)
French writers about music
People from Castelnaudary